Porchetta is a pork roast in Italian cuisine.

Porchetta may also refer to:
Porchetta (family name), a surname of Italian origin
La Porchetta, an Italian restaurant franchise in Australia and New Zealand